Jesse David Leach (born July 3, 1978) is an American musician from Providence, Rhode Island, and is the lead vocalist of the metalcore band Killswitch Engage. He is also a vocalist for Times of Grace and The Weapon. Leach co-founded Killswitch Engage in 1999, but left the band in 2002; in February 2012, he rejoined the group following the departure of vocalist Howard Jones. He currently resides in the Catskill Mountains in New York.

Biography

Early career
Leach's first band, Corrin, was formed in the early 1990s. Corrin recorded four songs in 1996 which were eventually released as a CD by Propaganda Machine in 1998 after the band's breakup.

Leach's second band, Nothing Stays Gold, formed in the mid-90s. They put out a single EP before splitting in 97/98.

Killswitch Engage

Some remaining members of Overcast and Aftershock were forming a new band in the Massachusetts area and were seeking a vocalist. In 1999, Leach along with bassist Mike D'Antonio, guitarist Joel Stroetzel, and drummer Adam Dutkiewicz formed Killswitch Engage. Their self-titled debut was released on July 11, 2000.

Killswitch Engage's next effort, Alive or Just Breathing, was released on May 21, 2002, putting Killswitch Engage at the forefront of the metalcore scene. Two weeks prior to going on tour, however, Leach married his fiancée. When he was not contacting his wife, Leach would sit alone in the tour van for hours after shows and simply wait for the remaining band members to return. Leach's passion for his music combined with his emotional struggles at the time made him unable to exercise control over his screaming. He would blow his voice out after a few shows and struggle with the rest of the tour. Leach also began suffering from mild depression, which grew worse as the tour continued. According to Mike D'Antonio in an interview for Killswitch's "(Set This) World Ablaze" DVD, "It seemed like there was always this dark cloud over Jesse's head." His depression led him to resign from the band and drop out of the public eye for some time. Leach wrote an email to the band explaining why he left. Quoting Leach from his interview in the DVD, "I didn't have the mental energy to face them, or even call them on the phone rather. I was at a point in my life where I just didn't want to face any of them so I wrote them a long email explaining, like, I'm just done. Explaining what every song meant to me, explaining what the whole experience was to me, and I said 'Bye. Ya know? You're not going to be able to find me, I'm going on my honeymoon finally. And, uh, don't try and call me don't try and contact me, I'm done. Done with music, period.'"

Leach reconciled with his former bandmates in 2005 at the Roadrunner United 25th anniversary concert, performing a duet with then singer Howard Jones. The entire band played on stage (minus Adam D who had been out with an injury and was replaced by Andreas Kisser of Sepultura) with both Jones and Leach singing "My Last Serenade". The song ended with the two embracing and Leach thanking the crowd for their support through his difficult times.

On February 6, 2012, Killswitch Engage uploaded a photo of Leach and the rest of the band to the website, indicating Leach's return to Killswitch Engage. Killswitch Engage later released a statement via Facebook, confirming Leach's permanent return to the band. In several interviews since he has given much credit to Jones for his work with the band while he had been gone.

Killswitch Engage's sixth studio album Disarm the Descent was released on April 2, 2013. It was announced in December 2013 that "In Due Time" was nominated for "Best Metal Performance" at the 2014 Grammy Awards, becoming the band’s first Grammy nomination with Leach.

On March 11, 2016, Killswitch Engage released their seventh album Incarnate.

Atonement, their eighth album, was released in August 16th, 2019, featuring a duet with former vocalist Howard Jones titled “The Signal Fire”.

Seemless

In 2003 Jesse joined a blues rock band called Seemless. Seemless toured the US many times with bands like Fu-Manchu, The Sword, Trivium, and In Flames. Seemless is known for having explosive, emotive live shows and showcases Leach's new-found soulful blues-y vocals. Touring with Seemless also proved that Jesse was back and able to complete tours. Seemless has released two albums and has had multiple videos featured on MTV's Headbangers Ball. In 2006, their video for the single "Cast No Shadow" made MTV's Top Ten new videos. Seemless is currently writing new songs and playing occasionally. Due to drummer Derek Kerswill's involvement with Unearth, among other projects, Seemless has taken a hiatus from touring.

The Empire Shall Fall

In 2008, Jesse Leach formed the band The Empire Shall Fall with friends in his area. The band released their first independent album Awaken on November 17, 2009. The Empire Shall Fall consists of Leach, guitarists Jake Davenport and Marcus de Lisle, bassist Nick Sollecito, and drummer Jeff Pitts.

Times of Grace

Leach worked on another album with Killswitch Engage bandmate Adam Dutkiewicz. Leach has stated that the working title for the project with Dutkiewicz is Times of Grace. Their debut album was released on January 18, 2011, and has Dutkiewicz on lead vocals on several tracks. The album's first single, "Strength in Numbers", was released on October 15 via Roadrunner Records as a free digital download for 72 hours for those who signed up for the band's mailing list. The song is now available for purchase on iTunes. The album was made with the support of Killswitch Engage.

Other projects

George Fisher told in "The Jasta Show", that Jesse Leach wrote the lyrics for his (Fisher's new side project called Serpentine Dominion, also consisting of Adam Dutkiewicz from Killswitch Engage and Shannon Lucas. He explained, “I originally was going to write stuff for the new band, and you know what? Writing lyrics has just never been my thing, and we were getting down to when I was supposed to go up there and lay down my vocals. And Adam just said, 'Look, I'll ask Jesse to write some stuff.' So he wrote it, and I just said I don't want no pro-religious crap 'cause I ain't about all that. Anyway, so it's more just about like getting revenge against corrupt motherfuckers and shit like that. And so Jesse wrote a bunch of lyrics and Adam arranged a lot of it, and then when I went up there, we recorded it in his bedroom of his house. And, basically, I would be, like, 'No, wait. We've gotta change this, fix that.' Maybe we'd tweak a word or take a word out or take a couple words out or take some lines out. We just basically fucked with it, you know? And I went up two or three different times to work on the vocals."

In May 2017, Leach stated on his official Instagram account that he had begun writing songs for his new hardcore punk project titled The Weapon. On May 20, 2020, The Weapon released their debut album, A Repugnant Turn of Events.

Since 2020, Leach has also been sporadically releasing ambient music under the moniker The Way Back Within.

Discography

Corrin
 Despair Rides On Angel Wings [EP] (1995)
 Corrin/Arise Split (1996)
 Plutonian Shores (1998)

Nothing Stays Gold
 Nothing Stays Gold (EP) (1998)

Killswitch Engage
 Killswitch Engage (July 4, 2000)
 Alive or Just Breathing (May 21, 2002)
 The End of Heartache (May 11, 2004) - Guest vocals on "Take This Oath" and "Irreversal".
 Disarm the Descent (April 2, 2013)
 Incarnate (March 11, 2016)
 Atonement (August 16, 2019)
 Live at the Palladium (June 3, 2022)

Seemless
 Seemless (January 25, 2005)
 What Have We Become (September 5, 2006)

The Empire Shall Fall
 Awaken (November 17, 2009)
 Solar Plexus (August 30, 2011)

Times of Grace
 The Hymn of a Broken Man (January 18, 2011)
 Songs of Loss and Separation (July 16, 2021)

The Weapon
 A Repugnant Turn Of Events (May 22, 2020)

Guest appearances
Killswitch Engage – "Take This Oath"
Killswitch Engage – "Irreversal" (The End of Heartache Special Edition)
Killswitch Engage – "Loyalty" (Game of Thrones: Catch the Throne; the Mixtape Volume II) 
Roadrunner United – "Blood And Flames" (Leach, Heafy, Rand, D'Antonio, Kelly) (Roadrunner Records 25th Anniversary)
Thy Will Be Done – "Preserving The Sacred"
Atresia – "Life from Life" (Heavy Metal Mixtape)
Serpentine Dominion - Lyrics for the album
Machine Head - "Stop The Bleeding" (Civil Unrest)
Left to Vanish - "Healthy"
Wolfheart - "Ancestor"
August Burns Red - "Ancestry"

Acting career
Leach played a small role in the 1999 film "Outside Providence", directed by Michael Corrente. The film is an adaptation of Peter Farrelly's 1988 novel of the same name. Leach played a boy named Decenz.

References

External links
Killswitch Engage – (Set This) World Ablaze DVD (2006). Leach is featured and provides commentary.
KILLSWITCH ENGAGE | Rock Detector Last updated 14 April 2007
Brian Hull.net – Providence, RI – Music Information on Corrin.

American heavy metal singers
Musicians from Providence, Rhode Island
20th-century American singers
21st-century American singers
Living people
1978 births
Killswitch Engage members
Seemless members
20th-century American male singers
21st-century American male singers
Times of Grace members